John Cooper Lawton (11 July 1946 – 29 June 2021) was a British rock and blues vocalist best known for his work with Lucifer's Friend, Uriah Heep and the Les Humphries Singers.

Biography 
Lawton began his musical career in North Shields, England, in the early '60s with The Deans, a bunch of kids who decided at random that he should be singer. He then moved on to West One and later Stonewall which included John Miles, Vic Malcolm (later of Geordie) and Paul Thompson (later of Roxy Music).

After Stonewall finished their stint at Top Ten Club in Hamburg in 1969, Lawton decided to stay in Germany, after having been offered the job as singer with legendary German rock cult band Lucifer's Friend (1969–1976 and 1979–1995) with whom he recorded seven studio albums. He also joined the Les Humphries Singers, in the early '70s (which included the Eurovision Song Contest in '76).

In 1976 Lawton joined Uriah Heep as their frontman, recording the albums Firefly, Innocent Victim, Fallen Angel and Live in Europe '79, touring Europe and the U.S. until September 1979.

During his longstanding career Lawton has worked with some big names of rock, on various projects, including Roger Glover's "Butterfly Ball" live at the Royal Albert Hall in 1975, featuring David Coverdale, Glenn Hughes, Ian Gillan and Twiggy.  He sang on Eddie Hardin's "Wizard's Convention II" with Chris Farlowe, Denny Laine, Paul Jones and Tony Ashton.

Lawton worked with some of the finest record producers, including Tony Clarke (Moody Blues), Jimmy Miller (Rolling Stones), and Harold Faltermeyer (Pet Shop Boys), who produced the titles Lawton sang on the Lenny McDowell Project "Lost Paradise".

Lawton sang with German rock band Rebel, later known as Zar, on three albums, during the late '80s -'90s including their hit singles "Line of Fire" and "Eagles Flight", and moved on to Volker Barber's classical project "Excalibur". He also sang on several German commercials, including the "Colgate Gel" TV spots, the "Peter Stuyvesant Travel" spots, the Stuyvesant single "Come Together" and a stint for Harley Davidson Motorbikes.

Lawton formed GunHill, later known as JLB (John Lawton Band), in January 1994, touring the UK and Europe. In 1995 he briefly rejoined Uriah Heep for 2 weeks, to tour South Africa and Austria with Deep Purple, filling in for their singer Bernie Shaw, who was suffering from voice problems at the time.

Inspired by German top producer Robert Papst and his partner Reinhold Hoffman, Lawton re-recorded one of the Les Humphries Singers' favourites, the 1970s hit "Mama Loo", in January 1998. In August 2000, his solo album Still Paying My Dues to the Blues, produced by Robert Papst, was released in Europe, UK and Scandinavia, by Hypertension Music Hamburg and distributed through EDEL Germany. (The album has been re-released in 2010)

During the 4th Uriah Heep Annual Convention in London, May 2000, plans were made for a one-off concert by the so-called Hensley/Lawton Band. Lawton was joined by former Heep keyboardist Ken Hensley, for the first time 21 years after Lawton's departure from Uriah Heep in 1979. With them were Paul Newton (their original bassist), and 2 members of Lawton's band Reuben Kane on lead guitar and Justin Shefford on drums. They played a collection of old Heep classics and some of Hensley & Lawton's solo songs, and the concert was recorded for a CD release called The Return.

In 2001, Lawton teamed up with Ken Hensley to form the Hensley Lawton Band. After an extensive tour of Europe during Spring and Summer of 2001 culminating with a concert on 12 May in Hamburg, Germany featuring a full orchestra and a new rendition of Heep's old classic "Salisbury", both Ken and John returned to their respective solo careers.

On 7 December 2001, both John Lawton and Ken Hensley appeared on stage with Uriah Heep during the annual Magician's Birthday Party at the Shepherd's Bush Empire in London. This concert was recorded and released as a CD/DVD.

The John Lawton Band – "JLB" was taken on by Classic Rock Productions in 2001 to record the acoustic CD Steppin' It Up, which features John & Steve Dunning. One More Night Live at the Mean Fiddler, CD & DVD, was recorded in 2002, which was followed in 2003 by JLB's Sting in the Tale CD, an original studio rock album. Later that year followed another Live CD & DVD Shakin' The Tale. JLB had been touring extensively with their last gig in Hamburg, September 2004, when Lawton decided to take an indefinite break.

In May 2006 Lawton joined forces with Dutch guitarist Jan Dumée (ex-Focus) to form the On The Rocks project. On The Rocks – "OTR" featured Brazilian musicians Ney Conceição on bass, Xande Figueiredo on drums, and Marvio Ciribelli on keyboards. Lawton and Dumée wrote and recorded the tracks for the debut album Mamonama, released in October 2008.

In September 2008 John Lawton appeared on stage at the Heepvention 2008 in Spain, with former Uriah Heep members Ken Hensley, Lee Kerslake and Paul Newton, together with Jan Dumee from the OTR project on guitar.

In December 2008 John entered the world of television by presenting the Bulgarian travel documentary series "John Lawton presents" which also includes music from the Mamonama album.  Made by the Bulgarian TV company "Skat", the films feature interesting historical landmarks of Bulgarian towns and cities, traditional festivities and interviews with the city mayors and local people.  So far the series consists of 19 documentaries, including the municipalities of Karnobat, Sozopol, Tsarevo, Primorsko, Burgas, Smolyan, Pamporovo, Varna, Malko Tarnovo, Velingrad, Shumen, Popovo winter, Popovo spring, Chepelare, Lovech, Kavarna, Stara Zagora, Nedelino.

In 2009 John again joined Ken Hensley, Lee Kerslake and Paul Newton to appear at Heepvention 2009 in Salo, Finland with a Finnish guitarist completing the line-up.

In March 2010, John made his acting debut in the motion picture Love.net, filmed and produced by Bulgarian film company Miramar Film. Part of John's scenes were shot at Liscombe Park, UK, featuring a guest appearance by Uriah Heep guitarist Mick Box, with the remainder filmed in Sofia. He also recorded the movie's soundtrack song – Tonight. The film was premiered in Sofia on 26 March 2011.

In November 2011, Lawton teamed up with Bulgarian band Diana Express to record the album "The Power of Mind" which was composed by Dr. Milen Vrabevski. The album was released in 2012.

Lawton died unexpectedly on 29 June 2021, at the age of 74.

On 19 March 2022 his cremated ashes were scattered on Kamen Bryag, Bulgaria. On 1 July 2022 a monument to the musician was opened in the "Ogancheto" area of Kamen Bryag, where for years he performed the emblematic song "July morning" during the ritual welcome of the first morning of July. He was survived by his German wife Iris and their children.

Discography

With Asterix 
(pre-Lucifer's Friend)
 Asterix – 1970

With Lucifer's Friend 
 Lucifer's Friend – 1970
 Where the Groupies Killed the Blues – 1972
 I'm Just a Rock 'n' Roll Singer – 1973
 Banquet – 1974
 Mind Exploding – 1975
 Mean Machine – 1981
 Sumogrip – 1994
 Awakening – 2015
 Too Late To Hate – 2016
 Black Moon – 2019

With the Les Humphries Singers 
 We'll Fly You To The Promised Land – 1971
 We Are Goin' Down Jordan – 1971
 Singing Detonation – 1971
 Old Man Moses – 1971
 Mexico – 1972
 Sound '73 – 1973
 Mama Loo (= La Onu Cantante) – 1973
 Live in Europe – 1973
 Carnival – 1973
 Sound '73/II – 1973
 The World Of – 1973
 Kansas City – 1974
 Sound '74 – 1974
 One of These Days – 1974
 Rock 'n Roll Party – 1974
 Amazing Grace & Gospeltrain – 1975
 Party on the Rocks – 1975

With Uriah Heep 
 Firefly – 1977
 Innocent Victim – 1977
 Fallen Angel – 1978
 Live in Europe 79 – (recorded 1979, released 1986)
 The Magician's Birthday Party – (live, recorded 2001, released 2002)
 Magic Night – (live – recorded 2003, released 2004)

Solo 
 Heartbeat (also released as HardBeat; 1980)
 Still Payin' My Dues... (2000)
Heartbeat (Expanded) (Red Steel 2000)
Heepsteria! (Several solo, Gunhill & JLB contributions) (Red Steel 2000)

With Rebel 
 Stargazer – 1982
Rebel/Zar (Remastered 2 on 1) (Red Steel 2001)

With Zar 
 Live Your Life Forever – 1990
Rebel/Zar (Remastered 2 on 1) (Red Steel 2001)

With Gunhill 
 One Over the Eight – 1995
 Night Heat – 1997
 Live in Germany '99 – 1999

With the Hensley Lawton Band 
 The Return (Live at Heepvention 2000) – 2000

With the Lawton Dunning Project 
 Steppin' It Up – 2002
 One More Night (Live) – 2002

With the John Lawton Band 
 Sting in the Tale – 2003
 Shakin' the Tale (Live) – 2004

With Chris Catena 
 Freak Out! (Lawton features in the song "It's a long way to go" – 2003

With OTR – On The Rocks 
 Mamonama – 2008

With Intelligent Music Project 
 The Power of Mind (with Maxim Goranov Band; 2012)
  My Kind of Lovin' (2014)

References

External links 
 
 On The Rocks official website
 Official Uriah Heep website
 
 Interview with John Lawton

1946 births
2021 deaths
English heavy metal singers
English male singers
English rock singers
Les Humphries Singers members
People from Halifax, West Yorkshire
Uriah Heep (band) members